Rhys Clark (born 17 August 1994) is a former Scottish professional snooker player.

Career

Amateur
From the village of Stonehouse, South Lanarkshire in Scotland, Clark started playing snooker from aged 11. As an amateur he featured in various professional tournaments with his best results coming in the 2014 World Snooker Championship first round qualifier where he beat Mike Dunn 10–2 and the 2015 Indian Open wildcard round where he beat former professional Pankaj Advani 4–3.

Professional
In the first event of Q School, Clark reached the final round and made breaks of 63 and 59 against Leo Fernandez and won 4–1, a win which gave Clark a two-year card to the World Snooker Tour for the 2015–16 season  and 2016–17  seasons. He won his first match by beating Grant Miles 5–1 in the 2015 Australian Goldfields Open qualifiers, before losing by a reverse of this scoreline to Li Hang. At the UK Championship he was knocked out in the first round 1–6 by Mark Davis. A 5–0 whitewash over Ken Doherty with a high break of 104 saw Clark qualify for the China Open. In Clark's first appearance at a Chinese ranking event he won a match at a venue for the first time by beating Davis 5–4. In the next round Clark made breaks over 50 in each of the four frames he won, but was edged out 4–5 by Alfie Burden. His first season as a professional ended with an opening round 5–10 defeat to David Gilbert in World Championship qualifying.

Clark received a bye to the second round of the 2016 English Open and then eliminated Lee Walker 4–2 and Kyren Wilson 4–3 (finished the match with 50 plus breaks in five successive frames) to advance to the last 16 of a ranking event for the first time and he lost 1–4 to Stuart Bingham. Clark earned a second round televised match with Ronnie O'Sullivan at the UK Championship after squeezing past Li Hang 6–5, but was whitewashed 0–6. He knocked out Sean O'Sullivan 4–1 and Mitchell Mann at the Gibraltar Open, before losing 2–4 to Neil Robertson Clark ended the season 75th in the world rankings, but has earned a new two-year tour card through the one-year ranking list.

Performance and rankings timeline

References

External links
Rhys Clark at CueTracker.net: Snooker Results and Statistic Database
Rhys Clark at worldsnooker.com

1994 births
People from Stonehouse, South Lanarkshire
Living people
Scottish snooker players
Sportspeople from South Lanarkshire